Blanchard is a lunar impact crater that lies on the far side of the Moon, just behind the southwestern limb. It lies to the south-southwest of the crater Arrhenius, and northwest of Pilâtre. Further to the south is the rugged terrain to the north of the walled plain Hausen.

The rim of Blanchard is worn and rounded, with a  slight elongation along a northeastern direction. There  is a break in the northwest rim, formed by the satellite  crater Blanchard P. The two crater formations have nearly merged, and share the same interior floor. The remainder of the rim has several other breaks caused by impacts, particularly along the southeastern rim. The interior floor, although somewhat rough, does not contain a central peak or notable features.

This crater lies within the Mendel-Rydberg Basin, a 630 km wide impact basin of Nectarian age.

References

 
 
 
 
 
 
 
 
 
 
 
 

Impact craters on the Moon